A false ending is a device in film and music that can be used to trick the audience into thinking that the work has ended, before it continues.

The presence of a false ending can be anticipated through a number of ways. The medium itself might betray that the story will continue beyond the false ending. A supposed "ending" that occurs when many pages are still left in a book, when a film or song's running time hasn't fully elapsed, or when only half the world has been explored in a video game, is likely to be false. As such, stories with an indeterminate running length or a multi-story structure are much more likely to successfully deceive their audience with this technique. Another indicator is the presence of a large number of incomplete story lines, character arcs, or other unresolved story elements at the time of the false ending. These elements can leave the audience feeling that too much of the story is incomplete and there has to be more.

Film

In L.A. Confidential, it seems like the criminal case that the movie revolves around is completely closed with no loose ends until one of the witnesses admits that she lied about important details to give more importance towards the trial of the people who raped her, exposing a cover-up conspiracy. In The Lord of the Rings: The Return of the King, director Peter Jackson uses editing techniques that are indicative of endings in scenes that could be used as such, but continues until the movie finally ends. Spider-Man 3 has two false endings. Another example is in The Simpsons Movie, where, at a very climactic stage in the film, the screen fades away and says "To be continued", which is then followed by the word "Immediately." Also in The Lego Movie 2: The Second Part, at what appears to be a cliffhanger ending, a "The End" sign appears, only for Lucy (voiced by Elizabeth Banks) to break the fourth wall by insisting that the film will have a happy ending; the same sign appears again at the film's actual ending. After Evelyn (played by Michelle Yeoh) seemingly dies in the middle of Everything Everywhere All at Once, the words "The End" appear before a short portion of fake credits; this is followed by the reveal that the film was being watched by an audience in a universe where Evelyn becomes a movie star.

Some movies come to a formal ending, followed by the rolling of the credits, which is almost universally used to indicate that the film has ended, only to have the actors reappear in one or more mid-credits scenes. In comedy films, these sequences may be bloopers or outtakes. In other types of films, the mid-credit scenes may continue the narrative set out in the movie. The Marvel Cinematic Universe movies have become notorious for this, in some cases featuring a mid-credits scene and an end-credits scene in the same movie.

Music
False endings are a known device in classical music. Josef Haydn was fond of them, for example inducing applause at the wrong place in the finales of his String Quartet, Op. 33 No. 2 (nicknamed "The Joke") and Symphony No. 90. The first movement of Prokoviev's Classical Symphony contains false endings.

False endings are also a common custom in popular music. The Beatles used false endings in many of their songs, including "I'm Only Sleeping", "Get Back", "Hello, Goodbye", "Cry Baby Cry", "Helter Skelter", "Rain", and "Strawberry Fields Forever". Other songs that use false endings include Guns 'n' Roses' "November Rain", Bryan Adams' "(Everything I Do) I Do It For You", David Bowie's "Suffragette City", Gorillaz' "Dare", Natasha Bedingfield's "Unwritten", Foo Fighters' "Come Back", Alice in Chains' "Rain When I Die", and Beastie Boys' "Sabotage".

See also
Alternate ending
Multiple endings

References

Endings
Film and video terminology
Video game gameplay
Musical terminology
Songwriting